Nepsera is a monotypic genus of flowering plants belonging to the family Melastomataceae. The only species is Nepsera aquatica.

Its native range is Tropical America. It is found in the countries of Belize, Brazil, Colombia, Costa Rica, Cuba, Dominican Republic, Ecuador, French Guiana, Guatemala, Guyana, Haiti, Honduras, Jamaica, the Leeward Islands, Nicaragua, Panamá, Puerto Rico, Suriname, Trinidad-Tobago, Venezuela and the Windward Islands.

The genus name of Nepsera is in honour of Fridolin Karl Leopold Spenner (1798–1841), a German doctor and botanist. He was also director of the university botanical garden in Freiburg and professor of medical botany. The genus has a synonym, Homonoma . The Latin specific epithet of aquatica which is derived from "aquaticus" meaning in water. Both genus and species were first described and published in Ann. Sci. Nat., Bot., sér. 3, 13: 28 (1850.

References

Melastomataceae
Melastomataceae genera
Monotypic Myrtales genera
Plants described in 1845
Flora of Central America
Flora of Cuba
Flora of the Dominican Republic
Flora of Haiti
Flora of Jamaica
Flora of the Leeward Islands
Flora of Puerto Rico
Flora of Trinidad and Tobago
Flora of the Windward Islands
Flora of northern South America
Flora of Colombia
Flora of Ecuador
Flora of North Brazil
Flora of Northeast Brazil
Flora without expected TNC conservation status